Mausoleum in Wałbrzych, Schlesier-Ehrenmal (Silesian Monument of Glory) is a cenotaph commemorating 170 thousand Silesians who died during World War I, victims of accidents in mines and 25 local fighters of the National Socialist movement. It represents the style of monuments commemorating the victims of the war, while being at the same time an example of a propaganda monument to glory, typical of the monumental architecture of the Third Reich.

Location 
The building is located east of the center of Wałbrzych (Waldenburg), on the northern slope of the Niedźwiadki Mountain, commonly called the 5th festival hill, by the blue tourist trail and the red walking trail, at an altitude of approx. 510-530 m above sea level.

History 

The main idea, was to be a monument commemorating the inhabitants of the region who died during World War I, and victims of mining accidents, but because the Nazis had no social support in this area(cn) (The inhabitants of Waldenburg did not come in crowds during Hitler's visit in 1932, therefore they brought supporters from other regions.) been added 25 militants NSDAP. This emphasized that the soldiers, working people and fighters of the Nazi movement had an equal share in shaping the Nazi state.

The mausoleum in Waldenburg was built in the years 1936–1938 according to a design by Robert Tischler on the initiative of the People's Union for the Protection of German War Graves (VDK). It was made by companies from Waldenburg and stonemasons, who also worked on the construction of the mausoleum on Saint Anna's Mountain.

Architecture 

The structure is in the shape of a quadratic fortalice with dimensions of 24 x 27 meters and 6 meters high. The massive structure resembles ancient Mesopotamian buildings.The portico and the cloisters had a basement. On the sides there are small square mastabas, topped with sculptures of eagles taking flight, resting on stone balls with swastikas. In the center of the courtyard there was a metal column with a torch designed by Ernst Geiger and cast in the Würtembergische Metallwarenfabrik Geislingen-Steige factory. On the pedestal there were four lions with their mouths open, inspired by the sculpture of the Brunswick Lion. The column was decorated with a net ornament and oak leaves, the torch was supported by sculptures of three naked young men. In front of the mausoleum there was a parade ground with flagpoles.

Bibliography 

 Dorota Grygiel: Schlesier Ehrenmal – in memory of the Silesians in Wałbrzych (Digitalisat)
 Janusz L. Dobesz: Wrocławska architektura spod znaku swastyki na tle budownictwa III Rzeszy, Wrocław 1999
 Krzysztof Krzyżanowski, Tomasz Jurek, Wałbrzyskie Mauzoleum, "Odkrywca", 10/2019, str. 42-50.

External links 
https://polska-org.pl/535784,Walbrzych,Mauzoleum_ruina.html

https://www.radiowroclaw.pl/articles/view/80174/Totenburg-Jedyny-taki-obiekt-w-Europie-Swiatynia-Hitlera-k-Walbrzycha-ZOBACZ

References

Cultural history of World War II
History of Silesia
Lower Silesian Voivodeship
Nazi Germany
Silesian culture
Sudetes
Wałbrzych
Nazi architecture